Skins is a British teen drama created by father-and-son television writers Bryan Elsley and Jamie Brittain for Company Pictures. The sixth series began airing on E4 on 23 January 2012 and ended on 26 March 2012. Like the previous series, it follows the lives of the third generation of characters, which consists of Franky Fitzgerald, Rich Hardbeck, Grace Blood, Mini McGuinness, Liv Malone, Alo Creevey, brothers Nick and Matty Levan, and new character Alex Henley.

Main cast

List of episodes

References

External links

Series 06
2012 British television seasons

de:Liste der Skins-Episoden